Neoleptura is a genus of beetles in the family Cerambycidae, containing the following species:

 Neoleptura alpina Chemsak & Linsley, 1976
 Neoleptura auripennis Chemsak & Linsley, 1976
 Neoleptura lecontei Thomson, 1860
 Neoleptura minutipunctis Chemsak & Linsley, 1976

References

Lepturinae